Park Jun-woo (born 28 October 1995) is a South Korean sport shooter.

He participated at the 2018 ISSF World Shooting Championships, winning a medal.

References

External links

Living people
1995 births
South Korean male sport shooters
ISSF pistol shooters
Universiade silver medalists for South Korea
Universiade medalists in shooting
Medalists at the 2015 Summer Universiade